Mangelia tritaeniata is a species of sea snail, a marine gastropod mollusk in the family Mangeliidae.

Description
The length of the shell attains 8 mm, its diameter 2.5 mm.

The small shell has a fusiform shape. It contains 8 whorls, of which two or three vitreous and globular whorls in the protoconch. The subsequent ventricose whorls are considerably impressed at the suture. They are longitudinally crossed by many, not very sharp ribs (about 15 on the body whorl) and intersected by thin, spiral lirae. The narrow aperture is oblong. The outer lip is thin. The columella is simple and oblique. The sinus is obscure. The siphonal canal is wide and produced. The shell shows three characteristic red bands on the body whorl.

Distribution
This marine species occurs off Mumbai, Western India.

References

External links
  Tucker, J.K. 2004 Catalog of recent and fossil turrids (Mollusca: Gastropoda). Zootaxa 682:1-1295.
 

tritaeniata
Gastropods described in 1917